Collin Lake 223 is an Indian reserve of the Mikisew Cree First Nation in Alberta, located within the Regional Municipality of Wood Buffalo.

References

Indian reserves in Alberta